Le Chambon-sur-Lignon (literally "Le Chambon on Lignon") is a commune in the Haute-Loire department in south-central France.

Residents have been primarily Huguenot or Protestant since the 17th century. During World War II these Huguenot residents made the commune a haven for Jews fleeing from the Nazis. They hid them both within the town and in the countryside, and helped them flee to neutral Switzerland. In 1990 the town was one of two collectively honoured as the Righteous Among the Nations by Yad Vashem in Israel for saving Jews in Nazi-occupied Europe. The other awardee was the Dutch village of Nieuwlande.

Geography
The town lies in the middle of the commune, on the right bank of the Lignon du Velay, which flows north-northwestward through the commune and forms part of its northwestern border.

World War II
During World War II, throughout France, the Nazis and the collaborationist Vichy regime were rounding up Jews and sending them to the death camps.

Under the leadership of local Protestant minister Pastor André Trocmé, and his deputy pastor , the citizens of the village of Le Chambon-sur-Lignon risked their lives to rescue and hide Jews in private homes, on farms in the area, as well as in public institutions. Whenever the Nazi patrols came searching, the Jews were hidden in the mountainous countryside.

After the war, one of the villagers recalled: "As soon as the soldiers left, we would go into the forest and sing a song. When they heard that song, the Jews knew it was safe to come home." The situation took a more tense turn when the Germans invaded the South Zone in 1942. Local people continued to protect the Jews in open defiance of the authorities. For instance, they gave Vichy Youth Minister  a petition against the deportation of the Jews when he visited the village in 1942.

In addition to providing shelter, the citizens of the town obtained forged identification and ration cards for Jews to use. They helped them cross the border to the safety of neutral Switzerland. Some of the residents were arrested by the Gestapo such as Rev. Trocmé's cousin, Daniel Trocmé, who was sent to Maidanek concentration camp, where he was murdered.

It was estimated that the people of the area of Le Chambon-sur-Lignon saved between 3,000 and 5,000 Jews from certain death.

Present day
The ethos and practice of sheltering refugees continues, with migrants coming from many war zones, including Congo, Libya, Rwanda, South Sudan, Kosovo and Chechnya.

In 2021 the commune was bequeathed around €2m by Eric Schwam who was hidden in a school in 1943 and remained until 1950.

Population

Honors
In 1981 the entire town was awarded an honorary degree by Haverford College in Pennsylvania in recognition of its humanitarian efforts. 
In 1982, documentary filmmaker Pierre Sauvage – who was born and sheltered in Le Chambon – returned there to film Weapons of the Spirit (1989).  
In 1990, for risking their lives to rescue Jews, the entire town was recognized as "Righteous Among the Nations". A small garden and plaque on the grounds of the Yad Vashem memorial to the Holocaust in Israel was dedicated to the people of Chambon-sur-Lignon. 
In 2004 French President Jacques Chirac officially recognized the heroism of the town. 
In January 2007 they were honoured along with the other French Righteous Among the Nations in a ceremony at the Panthéon in Paris.

Eric Schwam, an Austrian man who fled the Nazis with his family during the Second World War and found refuge in the village, bequeathed approximately €2 million for the village.

Education
The town of Chambon-sur-Lignon is home to Le Collège-Lycée Cévenol International, a private boarding school founded in 1938 by local Protestant ministers André Trocmé and Edouard Theis. The school closed its doors in 2014 due to financial troubles and declining enrollment, three years after the rape and murder of a 14-year-old student.

Personalities
Alexander Grothendieck, a central figure of 20th-century mathematics, was among the Jewish children sheltered during the war.

The paternal grandfather of actor Timothée Chalamet was from the town.

Popular culture
Malcolm Gladwell uses Chambon-sur-Lignon in his book David and Goliath as an example of how the rebellious origin of its people influenced their actions when protecting Jewish people during the Second World War.

Twin towns
 Fislisbach, Switzerland
 Meitar, Israel - since November 9, 2006

Notes

References
 
  
 
   Aired in the United States by the PBS.
   A book for youngsters.

See also
Communes of the Haute-Loire department

External links
 Chambon Foundation
 About Le Chambon-sur-Lignon at Yad Vashem site

 College-Lycee International Cevenol
 https://web.archive.org/web/20090507153307/http://www.ushmm.org/outreach/rescuchr.htm
 http://www.hiddenonthemountain.com/

Communes of Haute-Loire
The Holocaust in France
French Righteous Among the Nations